The Lorraine-Hanriot LH.70 or S.A.B. LH.70 was a French trimotor designed to a 1930 government programme for a colonial policing aircraft. Only two were built.

Design
The LH.70 was entirely conceived and directed by the Société Aérienne Bordelaise (S.A.B), one a series of nine prototype colonial policing aircraft from different manufacturers.  The programme was led by the Direction Générale Technique and one of its requirements was for all metal construction to withstand the hot and humid climates of French African colonies.  Another was to provide a large and flexible load carrying space, so it could be used for  variety of tasks.

It had a high wing of trapezoidal plan, built in three parts: a short central section which joined the fuselage and two outer panels occupying the great majority of the span.  The wings were constructed around four spars and, like the rest of the aircraft were duralumin skinned.  There were high aspect ratio ailerons over more than half the span.

The LH.70 was powered by three  Lorraine 9Na Algol nine cylinder radial engines with narrow chord ring cowlings. Two were mounted on the undersides of the wings with full-chord nacelles behind them. The third engine was on the nose of the fuselage, which was in three rectangular section parts, built around four longerons and skinned with longitudinally corrugated duralumin. The forward part included the engine mountings and the enclosed cabin just ahead of the wing, seating the pilots side-by-side with dual controls. The final part, which had a sloping underside, provided an open dorsal cockpit for an observer and reached back to the tail. There were three fuel tanks, one under the pilots' cabin and two in the rear of the wings.

The empennage was conventional apart from one feature.  The trapezoidal fixed surfaces were built around pairs of spars and skinned with corrugated dural, with a cantilever tailplane mounted on top of the fuselage.  Its slightly tapered, unbalanced rudder extended down to the keel and worked in a small cut-out between the similarly shaped elevators. The novel feature was the result of the colonial's need for multi-tasking and consequent wide range of centre of gravity.  Instead of trim tabs, the LH.70 had a pair of trapezoidal winglets, mounted on the lower longerons about  ahead of the elevator hinge and projecting about  out of the fuselage.

To cope with rough colonial landing fields the LH.70 needed a robust undercarriage.  Its  track was determined by the separation of the outer engines, as each vertical, shock absorbing oleo strut was fixed to the second wing spar within the nacelle.  Instead of an axle each wheel hub was mounted on a near-horizontal V-strut, hinged on the lower fuselage longeron.  The wheels had hydraulic brakes. At the rear there was an oleo-damped, steerable tailskid.

Development

The exact date of the LH.70's first flight is not known but it was between May 1932, when two examples were reported as under construction at Bordeaux-Merignac and January 1933, when one LH.70 was at Villacoublay where Descamps demonstrated it to S.T.I.Aé officials. At the same time the other LH.70 was at Bordeaux undergoing modifications. At Villacoublay modifications to the LH.70 required a redetermination of the centre of gravity.  It was back in Bordeaux early in 1934, but soon returned to Villacoubly where, after three months, Deschamps once again demonstrated it to the S.T.I.Aé. It did not succeed in the competition for a production contract, which was won by the Bloch MB.120, and no more were built. Their history after this is not known.

Specifications

References

External links
 Aviafrance L.H. 70

Trimotors
1930s French military utility aircraft
L.070
Société Aérienne Bordelaise
High-wing aircraft
Aircraft first flown in 1932